Tun Dr. Lim Chong Eu (28 May 1919 – 24 November 2010) was a Malaysian politician who served as the 2nd Chief Minister of Penang from May 1969 to October 1990. He was also the founding president of Parti Gerakan Rakyat Malaysia (GERAKAN). He was termed as the "Architect of Modern Penang."

Early life
Lim was born in 1919 in Penang. He is the older brother of Lim Chong Keat, the architect and botanist. He attended school at the Penang Free School, where he was the King's Scholar in 1937. He later obtained a degree in medicine and surgery from the University of Edinburgh, Scotland in 1944.

Political career
In 1951, he was appointed to the Penang Local Council and in 1955, was appointed a member of the Federal Legislature.

In the March 1958 Malaysian Chinese Association (MCA) party elections, he challenged Tun Tan Cheng Lock and won the presidency with a majority of 22 votes.

During the one-year period when the MCA was under Lim, the party came under tremendous pressure from within and outside. After his victory, he called an extraordinary general meeting to amend the Constitution to consolidate the power of the Central Committee. This was met with strong resistance by Tun Tan Siew Sin and his supporters. Although the proposal was passed with a single-vote majority, the move left the Party split.

At the same time, the MCA under Lim also had severe political differences with the then Prime Minister Tunku Abdul Rahman. The crisis worsened on the eve of the 1959 general elections when Lim demanded 40 parliamentary seats and also wanted to make Chinese an official language. The Tunku increased the seats allocated to MCA from 28 to 31 but this was rejected and their relationship worsened.

Tunku Abdul Rahman rejected Lim's demands, prompting Lim to resign as president of MCA and he left for England for a vacation.  Dr Cheah Toon Lock then became the Acting President of MCA. Lim returned to Malaya after a few years and formed a new party, the United Democratic Party, in 1962.

He was one of the founding members of the Opposition Party Gerakan before the 1969 General Election. The formation of the Gerakan party threw the Chinese Malaysian aggregate into a dilemma, weakened their political strength and above all, eroded the political representation of the MCA as the only party for the Chinese community. Gerakan joined the ruling Barisan Nasional after winning the Penang State Government in 1969.

Chief Minister of Penang

Lim served as Chief Minister of Penang from 1969 to 1990. The iconic projects that emerged during Lim's rule included the 66-storey KOMTAR administrative tower and commercial complex, and the 13.5 km Penang Bridge. When it was topped-off, KOMTAR was for some time the tallest building in Asia, and the Penang Bridge one of the longest in the world. Lim is best known for overseeing the emergence of Penang's Free Trade Zone (FTZ) – later renamed Free Industrial Zone – which evolved into one of Asia's most powerful electronics hubs.

In the Malaysian General Elections of October 1990, a crisis occurred when Lim, serving as the chief minister, lost his state seat and Parti Gerakan Rakyat Malaysia (Gerakan) had fewer seats than UMNO in the Penang State Assembly. A crisis was averted when Tun Dr Lim Keng Yaik, the then president of Gerakan, was able to convince the then Prime Minister Tun Dr Mahathir Mohamad to allow an ethnic Chinese to continue on in the role of the Chief Minister.

Retirement and death
Lim had retired from politics and was concentrating on business. He was at the time chairman and advisor for several large corporations. In 2007, Lim was named founding chancellor of Wawasan Open University.

In late October 2010, he was admitted to the Penang Hospital after suffering a stroke. He later died on Wednesday, 24 November 2010 at his home in Hillside, Tanjung Bungah at about 9 pm. On Thursday, 25 November 2010, he was given a state funeral. The Penang state flag was flown at half-mast from 25 to 28 November for 4 days as a mark of respect. His body was later cremated at the Batu Gantung Crematorium on Sunday, 28 November 2010.

Honours

Honours of Malaysia
  :
 Recipient of the Malaysian Commemorative Medal (Sliver) (PPM) (1965)
 Grand Commander of the Order of Loyalty to the Crown of Malaysia (SSM) – Tun (1991)
  :
  Knight Grand Commander of the Order of the Defender of State (DUPN) – Dato' Seri Utama (1989)
  :
 Knight Commander of the Order of the Star of Hornbill Sarawak (DA) – Datuk Amar (1996)

Places named after him
The 17.84 km Tun Dr Lim Chong Eu Expressway (Federal Route 3113) comprising Jelutong Expressway and Bayan Lepas Expressway was renamed after him on 7 December 2010.

Other memorials included Bangunan Tun Dr Lim Chong Eu, a main headquarters of the Penang Development Corporation (PDC) located at Persiaran Mahsuri, Bayan Lepas.

References

External links

|-

|-

1919 births
People from Penang
2010 deaths
Alumni of the University of Edinburgh
Chief Ministers of Penang
Members of the Dewan Rakyat
Members of the Penang State Legislative Assembly
Malaysian medical doctors
Malaysian politicians of Chinese descent
Presidents of Malaysian Chinese Association
Former Malaysian Chinese Association politicians
United Democratic Party (Malaysia) politicians
Malaysian people of Hokkien descent
Malaysian people of Chinese descent
Parti Gerakan Rakyat Malaysia politicians
Malaysian Buddhists
Malaysian political party founders
Penang state executive councillors
Grand Commanders of the Order of Loyalty to the Crown of Malaysia
Knights Commander of the Order of the Star of Hornbill Sarawak